Lloyd Peers ( (born 2 February 1991) is a Welsh rugby union player. A lock forward, he plays club rugby for the Ospreys.

References

External links
 Ospreys profile

Welsh rugby union players
Ospreys (rugby union) players
1991 births
Living people
Rugby union players from Caerphilly
Rugby union locks
Scarlets players